Pape Amadou Diallo (born 25 June 2004) is a Senegalese professional footballer who plays as a forward for Metz B.

Club career
In February 2023, Diallo signed for French side Metz.

International career

Youth
Diallo was called up to the Senegalese under-20 side for the 2023 Africa U-20 Cup of Nations. Diallo socred two goals against Mozambique and went on to defeat The Gambia in the finals to win the tournament for the first time.

Senior
Diallo scored two goals at the 2022 African Nations Championship, as Senegal went on to win the competition for the first time.

Career statistics

Club

Notes

International

Scores and results list Senegal's goal tally first, score column indicates score after each Diallo goal.

References

2004 births
Living people
Senegalese footballers
Senegal youth international footballers
Senegal international footballers
Association football forwards
Senegal Premier League players
Génération Foot players
FC Metz players
Senegalese expatriate footballers
Senegalese expatriate sportspeople in France
Expatriate footballers in France
2022 African Nations Championship players
Senegal A' international footballers
People from Saint-Louis, Senegal